Roy Cross (born 23 April 1924) RSMA GAvA is a British artist and aviation journalist best known as the painter of artwork used on Airfix kits from the 1960s.

Born in Southwark, London and mainly self-taught, he learned his craft at the Camberwell School of Art and as a technical illustrator for training manuals for Fairey Aviation during the second world war. He progressed from there to producing advertising art for the aircraft industry and other companies. He illustrated for The Aeroplane and the Eagle comic.

In 1952 he joined the Society of Aviation Artists, but it is for his work at Airfix which he is best known. He started in 1964 with box art for Airfix's Do 217 and his last work for them was the box art for the German heavy cruiser Prinz Eugen (1974). He went into marine paintings.

Much of the Airfix artwork was destroyed but the lids of many millions of boxes remain

He was interviewed by James May in James May's Top Toys, discussing the changing tastes in box art and the airbrushing out of bombs and explosions from his pictures.

Notes

References
 Cross, Roy (2009) The Vintage Years of Airfix Box Art, The Crowood Press, 
 Celebration of Flight: The Aviation Art of Roy Cross, Arthur Ward, The Crowood Press (2002), 
 Profile as AskArt.com
 Early Aeroplanes 1907–1918, Roy Cross, Hugh Evelyn Limited.
Official Website http://roycrossfineart.co.uk/

1924 births
Living people
Alumni of Camberwell College of Arts
British male journalists
British marine artists
Aviation artists